The 1981 Washington State Cougars football team was an American football team that represented Washington State University in the Pacific-10 Conference (Pac-10) during the 1981 NCAA Division I-A football season. In their fourth season under head coach Jim Walden, the Cougars compiled an 8–3–1 record (5–2–1 in Pac-10, tied for fourth), and outscored their opponents 297 to 197.

The team's statistical leaders included Clete Casper with 939 passing yards, Tim Harris with 915 rushing yards, and Jeff Keller with 495 receiving yards.

The Cougars entered the Apple Cup with an  record and a win over Washington at Husky Stadium would clinch the Pac-10 title and a Rose Bowl berth, their first in  The Huskies prevailed again at home, and then shut out Iowa in the Rose Bowl.

The Cougars went to the Holiday Bowl in San Diego, and lost a close, entertaining game to Brigham Young of the WAC, led by consensus All-American quarterback Jim McMahon, the fifth overall selection of the 1982 NFL Draft.

Schedule

Roster

NFL Draft
Four Cougars were selected in the 1982 NFL Draft.

References

Washington State
Washington State Cougars football seasons
Washington State Cougars football